Kinesin-like protein KIF20B is a protein that in humans is encoded by the KIF20B gene.

Interactions
MPHOSPH1 has been shown to interact with PIN1.

References

Further reading